Albert Francis Judd (January 7, 1838 – May 20, 1900) was a judge of the Kingdom of Hawaii who served as Chief Justice of the Supreme Court through its transition into part of the United States.

Life
Judd was born January 7, 1838, at what was known as the "Old Mission Home" in Honolulu. His father was the physician and statesman Gerrit P. Judd (1803–1873) and mother was Laura Fish Judd (1804–1872).
On his father's side, he was a descendant of Thomas Hastings who came from the East Anglia region of England to the Massachusetts Bay Colony in 1634. Judd attended Punahou School (founded by his father), and two years of study under William DeWitt Alexander 1858–1860. After graduating from Yale in 1862, he received a law degree from Harvard Law School in 1864.

Career
He served in the army of the Kingdom from 1866 to 1871 rising to the rank of captain. From 1868 through 1873 he served in the House of Representatives and from 1868 in the House of Nobles of the Legislature of the Hawaiian Kingdom. In 1873 he helped elect King Lunalilo, and served as attorney general from January 13, 1873, until February 17, 1874. He then helped elect King Kalākaua after Lunalilo's short reign.

He was appointed as Associate Justice of the Supreme Court in 1874, and promoted to Chief Justice November 5, 1881. He served as chief justice for 19 years until his death. Walter F. Frear then became chief justice. In 1881 he served on a commission to revise laws of the Kingdom. He was a stabilizing influence throughout the turbulent overthrow of the Kingdom of Hawaii in 1893, Provisional Government of Hawaii, Republic of Hawaii, and finally formation of the Territory of Hawaii in 1898.

Marriage and children 
On April 4, 1872, in Geneva, New York, he married Agnes Hall Boyd (1844–1934) and they had nine children:
Agnes Elizabeth Judd, (November 18, 1873 – November 23, 1953)
Albert Francis Judd Jr. (December 20, 1874 – December 18, 1939) married Madeline Perry Hartwell, daughter of judge Alfred S. Hartwell in 1899 and had four children.
James Robert Judd (May 20, 1876 – June 2, 1947) married Alice Louise Marshall in 1908. 
Allan Wilkes Judd (February 27, 1879 – ?) married Elizabeth Anna McCarthy in 1907.
Henry Pratt Judd (March 15, 1880 – October 13, 1955) married Martha Stevens Case in 1909.
Charles Sheldon Judd (July 11, 1881 – June 29, 1939) married Louise Luqiens in 1910.
Sophie Boyd Judd (May 17, 1883 – January 28, 1966) married George Paul Cooke (1881–1960), was mother of Francis Judd Cooke. Their great-grandson was Steve Cooke. George Paul was son of businessman Charles Montague Cooke, grandson of Amos Starr Cooke.
Gerrit Parmele Judd, III., (February 15, 1885 – February 17, 1963) married Marguerite Foulke in 1910.
Lawrence McCully Judd (March 20, 1887 – October 4, 1968) and became Governor of the Territory of Hawaii in 1929–1934.

Death 
He died May 20, 1900, in Honolulu after an illness of several months.

References

Further reading

 Buckminster, Lydia N.H., The Hastings Memorial, A Genealogical Account of the Descendants of Thomas Hastings of Watertown, Mass. from 1634 to 1864, Boston: Samuel G. Drake Publisher (an undated NEHGS photoduplicate of the 1866 edition).
 Judd IV, Gerrit P., Dr. Judd, Hawaii's friend, A biography of Gerrit Parmele Judd (1803–1873), Honolulu: University of Hawaii Press, 1960.

External links
 Descendants of Thomas Hastings website
 Descendants of Thomas Hastings on Facebook

"A List of All the Cabinet Ministers Who Have Held Office in the Hawaiian Kingdom"

Includes a list of Attorneys General for the Kingdom of Hawaii, their salaries and budgets

Hawaiian Kingdom judges
Members of the Hawaiian Kingdom House of Representatives
Chief justices of the Hawaiian Kingdom
Hawaiian Kingdom Attorneys General
Members of the Hawaiian Kingdom House of Nobles
Members of the Hawaiian Kingdom Privy Council
1900 deaths
1838 births
Harvard Law School alumni
Yale University alumni
Punahou School alumni
Politicians from Honolulu
Chancellors of the Hawaiian Kingdom
Judd family